Red Velvet – Irene & Seulgi (stylized as Red Velvet - IRENE & SEULGI) is the first sub-unit of South Korean girl group Red Velvet, formed by SM Entertainment in 2020. It is composed of members Irene and Seulgi. The duo debuted on July 6, 2020, with the extended play Monster.

History

2020: Formation, debut, and Monster
On April 21, 2020, SM Entertainment revealed that Irene and Seulgi would form Red Velvet's first sub-unit. On the same day, it was announced that the unit would release their first extended play in June. The release of the mini album was later postponed on the grounds that it needed additional production on the album, in order to achieve a higher quality of music.

Before their debut as members of Red Velvet, the duo, as part of SR14G (SM Rookies 2014 Girls), notably performed a cover of  "Be Natural", a song that was sung originally by S.E.S. Their cover was well received by the public and Lee Soo-man, which eventually prompted the creation of their subunit. They also had several performances together during SM Town Live Special Stages.

On July 6, Red Velvet – Irene & Seulgi released their debut extended play Monster, which contained six tracks, including the singles "Monster" and "Naughty". With the release of their debut album, they became the best selling female sub-unit in South Korea in 2020. The duo made their debut performance on July 10 on Music Bank. From July 8 to September 8, the duo also starred in their own reality show, a spin-off of their group's Level Up Project!. On August 18, 2020, Irene & Seulgi appeared and performed at Time 100 Talks, a live event series wherein global leaders talk about innovative solutions to urgent global problems, and encourage cross-disciplinary action among stakeholders. Before their performance of "Monster", they also offered a message of appreciation and support to the frontliners during the COVID-19 pandemic.

Discography

Extended plays

Singles

Other charted songs

Filmography

Reality show

Music videos

Awards and nominations

Notes

References

External links 

  

Red Velvet (group)
2020 establishments in South Korea
K-pop music groups
Musical groups established in 2020
Musical groups from Seoul
SM Entertainment artists
SM Town
South Korean dance music groups
South Korean girl groups
South Korean musical duos